Bu'ale or Bu'aale (Somali: Bu'aale) is an agricultural city located in Middle Juba (Jubada dhexe) region of Somalia and the capital city of Jubaland state of Somalia.

History
During the Middle Ages, Bu'aale and its surrounding area was part of the Ajuran Empire that governed much of southern Somalia and eastern Ethiopia, with its domain extending from Hobyo in the north, to Qelafo in the west, to Kismayo in the south.

In the early modern period, Bu'aale was ruled by the Geledi Sultanate. The kingdom was eventually incorporated into Italian Somaliland protectorate in 1910 after the death of the last Sultan Osman Ahmed. After independence in 1960, the city was made the center of the official Bu'ale

Geography

Location
Bu'aale is located in the fertile Juba Valley in southeastern Somalia. Nearby settlements include to the northeast Xamareyso (5.0 nm), to the north Dalxiiska (1.3 nm), to the northwest Qeyla Dheere (6.4 nm), to the west Saamogia (0.9 nm), to the southwest Iach Bulle (17.0 nm), and to the south Qandal (7.5 nm). The largest cities in the country most proximate to Bu'aale are Jamaame (22 km), Jilib (97 km), and Merca (337 km).

Climate
Weather is hot year-round, with seasonal monsoon winds and irregular rainfall with recurring droughts. The gu rains, also known as the Southwest Monsoons, begin in April and last until July producing significant fresh water and allowing lush vegetation to grow. The gu season is followed by the xagaa (hagaa) dry season.

References

External links

 Districts of Somalia
 Administrative map of Bu'ale District

Districts of Somalia

Middle Juba